{{DISPLAYTITLE:C7H12N2O4}}
The molecular formula C7H12N2O4 (molar mass: 188.183 g/mol) may refer to:

 Aceglutamide, or acetylglutamine
 DMDM hydantoin
 Tabtoxinine β-lactam

Molecular formulas